The Badische Zeitung (Baden Newspaper) is a German newspaper based in Freiburg im Breisgau, covering the South Western part of Germany and the Black Forest region. It has a circulation of 145,825 and a readership of 409,000. The paper was founded in January 1946.

In December 2013, a cartoon by Horst Haitzinger published in the Badische Zeitung was selected by the Simon Wiesenthal Center as one of the top 10 anti-Semitic and anti-Israeli slurs of 2013 because it appeared in various newspapers, depicted the Prime Minister Israeli Benjamin Netanyahu as the poisoner of the depicted Peace Doves.

References

External links

 

Mass media in Freiburg im Breisgau
Daily newspapers published in Germany
German-language newspapers
Newspapers established in 1946